Ares was an American science fiction wargame magazine published by Simulations Publications, Inc. (SPI), and then TSR, Inc., between 1980 and 1984. In addition to the articles, each issue contained a wargame, complete with a foldout stiff paper map, a set of cardboard counters, and the rules.

Publication history
Simulations Publications, Inc. (SPI) began publishing Ares in 1980 as a science-fiction companion to Strategy & Tactics.Ares magazine was similar to Strategy & Tactics, with a game every issue, but it focused on science-fiction and fantasy. SPI suffered financial problems and went into debt, and TSR bought the company and its assets in 1982.  Shannon Appelcine stated that "TSR did very little with SPI's roleplaying games. Ares Magazine #12 (1982), which was prepared by SPI and published by TSR, included a game called 'Star Traders,' which was for use with Universe; it was the last support for that game system [...] As TSR turned further away from SPI's origins, Ares magazine soon became an Ares section in Dragon magazine. However, it didn't focus on the SPI RPGs, but instead became a place to talk about TSR's own science-fiction games, such as Gamma World and Star Frontiers. TSR published SPI's science-fiction and fantasy magazine, Ares, from issue #12 (1982) through issue #17 (1984), then incorporated it into Dragon Magazine from issue #84 (April 1984) to issue #111 (July 1986).

Seventeen issues were printed, plus two special issues. The SPI company published the first eleven bimonthly issues (and had prepared a twelfth) before financial difficulties led to the company being bought out by TSR in 1982. A further six issues, published quarterly, were put out by TSR and then publication of the magazine was ceased. However, the Ares legacy lived on for another couple of years; a large new section called the "Ares Section" was added to Dragon magazine starting with issue #84 (April 1984) and was treated as almost a magazine within a magazine. This special section provided support for science fantasy and superhero roleplaying games such as Gamma World, Marvel Super Heroes and Star Frontiers. The "Ares Section" ran through Dragon issue #111 (July 1986) after which it too was discontinued.

Reception
Jerry Epperson reviewed the first issue of Ares in The Space Gamer No. 28. Epperson commented that the first issue, and its game WorldKiller "was a disappointment. It's uneven. Expect nothing but the best in serious science fiction writing here, and nothing but the worst from the games."

In Issue 26 of Phoenix, Hamish Wilson liked the professional look of the first issue, calling it "well put together." But overall, he felt the magazine "lacks form, shape and direction [...] rather than being bold, uncompromising and nailing its colours to the mast, Ares has, as it were, crept out into the open with some fiction, some fact and some game."

See also
 Galac-Tac
 Starweb

References

External links
 Greg Costikyan's canonical listing of Ares issues
 A complementary listing of Ares issues
 Internet Archive holdings of Ares issues

Bimonthly magazines published in the United States
Defunct science fiction magazines published in the United States
Magazines established in 1980
Magazines disestablished in 1984
Science fiction magazines established in the 1980s
Wargaming magazines
Quarterly magazines published in the United States